Scopula infota is a moth of the  family Geometridae. It is found in Bolivia and Peru.

Subspecies
Scopula infota infota (Bolivia)
Scopula infota perfumosa (Warren, 1904) (south-eastern Peru)

References

I
Moths of South America
Moths described in 1897